Yanovo is a village in the municipality of Sandanski, in Blagoevgrad Province, Bulgaria. It is located 5km away from Katuntsi and 30km away from Sandanski.

References

Villages in Blagoevgrad Province